Davit Gabunia (born April 12, 1982) is a Georgian translator, playwright, and author. Inside Georgia, Gabunia is known for having translated the Harry Potter series of novels, as well as for being an outspoken pro-Europeanist. His debut novel, Falling Apart, was published in 2017, when it became a bestseller in Georgia.

Gabunia has twice won the Duruji Award for the best new play of the year, as well as the SABA award (საბა (ლიტერატურული პრემია)) for best drama for his play Plays. Some of his works have been translated into German.

Personal life 
Gabunia was born in Poti, Samegrelo-Zemo Svaneti, which at the time was part of the Georgian Soviet Socialist Republic. In 2003, he graduated from Tbilisi State University with a degree in English language and literature. Gabunia is openly gay.

See also 

 LGBT rights in Georgia

References 

1982 births
Living people
Culture of Georgia (country)
LGBT people from Georgia (country)
LGBT in Georgia (country)
People from Georgia (country)
21st-century LGBT people